AXS (pronounced access) is an American ticket outlet for sports and entertainment events, founded in 2011 and owned by Anschutz Entertainment Group (AEG), the world's second largest entertainment promoter behind Live Nation Entertainment. AEG operate venues globally, as well as promote events under their AEG Presents banner, meaning these venues and promoted events typically use AXS as their primary ticket outlet.

Background 

The initial AXS deployment was August 2011 and venues and services have been added in a phased roll out. As of August 2013, AXS was the exclusive or primary ticket provider for over 30 US venues and 9 UK venues. The first Staples Center concert available only through AXS was Beyoncé in 2013; both Los Angeles Lakers and the Los Angeles Clippers are still using Ticketmaster.
The white label technology Outbox developed enables AEG to sell tickets under either the AXS brand name or under local venue name brands, which have considerable local support, while providing centralized CRM services for either approach.

It was developed and is operated by Anschutz Entertainment Group (AEG) in partnership with Outbox Technology. In September 2019, AEG bought out Outbox's partnership and AXS is now a wholly owned subsidiary of AEG.

In January 2014, AEG announced that AXS had purchased Examiner.com, a user generated news site, in order to leverage the site's entertainment content. In 2015, AXS merged with the paperless ticketing system Veritix. The combined entity then generated more than $2 billion in annual transactions.

Outbox Technology 
AEG's partner for 8 years, Outbox was behind the development of the white label ticket selling technology. Founded in 2005 by husband and wife Jean-Francoys Brousseau and Constance Raymond, Outbox also counted the Cirque du Soleil among its shareholders. After gaining experience with their technology worldwide, it was in 2011 that Outbox created a partnership with AEG and AXS was born. Their ticket selling system allows all live entertainment venues to control their inventory, pricing, and consumer data without any third party involvement. In 2019, Outbox sold its stake in AXS to AEG.

Innovations

Fair AXS 

AXS aims to block large volume, automated purchases by computer programs used by ticket resalers by using a "waiting room" facility on a separate server. Users log their personal details and purchase information prior to tickets going on sale and are screened for multiple purchases.

AXS Invite 

AXS selectively offers an add-on feature, AXS Invite, which lets ticket purchasers reserve adjacent seats for friends, who have up to 48 hours to decide on receiving email or social media notification. Invite is not available when tickets are initially sold, is only available at some venues, and is unlikely to help at oversubscribed shows. AXS acknowledges that the feature is "really about finding a way to sell more tickets", while enhancing customer convenience.

Partnerships

Carbonhouse 

Carbonhouse, a website developer with over 300 clients worldwide, was acquired by AEG. This will allow integration of additional features into the AXS ticketing platform.

StubHub 

AEG had a partnership with StubHub, a secondary ticketing service owned by eBay, to place tickets from StubHub in AXS ticket listings. This Partnership ended in 2018 when AXS Mobile ID technology and the “FanSight” purchase experience technology will be integrated in 30 of AEG's U.S. venues.

References 

Online retailers of the United States
Companies based in Los Angeles
Ticket sales companies
Entertainment companies established in 2011
Retail companies established in 2011
Internet properties established in 2011